South Carolina Highway 160 (SC 160) is a  primary state highway in the U.S. state of South Carolina. It travels from North Carolina state line, through Fort Mill, ending in Indian Land.

Route description
SC 160 begins at the North Carolina state line near the Steele Creek area of Charlotte, North Carolina. Going southeast, it crosses Gold Hill Road northeast of Tega Cay before entering Fort Mill. The highway goes through the downtown area of Fort Mill, connecting briefly with U.S. Route 21 Business (US 21 Bus.). Continuing east, it ends at US 521 in Indian Land. The highway's width varies between two lanes and five lanes.

Alternate names
The highway has other known names it uses locally in areas.

 Fort Mill Highway – road name of highway west of Fort Mill to Lancaster County, though sometimes used interchangeably for entire route.
 John D. Patterson Memorial Highway – official South Carolina honorary name of SC 160 in Lancaster County.

History

The highway was established in 1942 as a renumbering of the second SC 211. The route has changed little since.

Old signs along highway use a north–south designation; newer signs designate the highway as east–west.

Junction list

Special routes

Fort Mill connector route

South Carolina Highway 160 Connector (SC 160 Conn.) is a  connector route of SC 160 in the north-central part of Fort Mill. It is actually the southernmost portion of the southbound lane of U.S. Route 21 Business (US 21 Bus.) at the point where it curves from a southwesterly direction to a west-southwesterly direction just north of that highway's concurrency with SC 160. The western terminus is opposite the Walter Elisha Park. There is no signage on this portion of the highway, either for the business route or the connector route. It is known as Old Nation Road and is an unsigned highway.

Fort Mill truck route

South Carolina Highway 160 Truck (SC 160 Truck) is a  truck route that bypasses downtown Fort Mill. Starting in the west, it follows U.S. Route 21 (US 21) north to SC 460 (Springfield Parkway), where it goes southeast back to SC 160.

See also

References

External links

SC 160 at Virginia Highways' South Carolina Highways Annex

160
Transportation in York County, South Carolina
Transportation in Lancaster County, South Carolina